The Oak Grove School is a historic school building in rural eastern Grant County, Arkansas. It is a single-story wood-frame structure, with a hip roof and novelty siding. It was built in 1938 with funding from the Works Progress Administration, and originally housed four classrooms. It was used as a school until 1950, and has served as the church since then.

The building was listed on the National Register of Historic Places in 1991.

See also
National Register of Historic Places listings in Grant County, Arkansas

References

School buildings on the National Register of Historic Places in Arkansas
Buildings and structures in Grant County, Arkansas
National Register of Historic Places in Grant County, Arkansas